WSSC (1340 AM) is a radio station broadcasting a Christian radio format. WSSC is licensed to serve the community of Sumter, South Carolina, United States.  The station is currently owned by Sumter Baptist Temple, Inc. and features programming from Fundamental Broadcasting Network.

References

External links

SSC
Radio stations established in 1968